Coco commonly refers to:

 Coco (folklore), a mythical bogeyman in many Hispano- and Lusophone nations

Coco may also refer to:

People
 Coco (given name), a first name, its shorthand, or unrelated nickname
 Coco (surname), a list of people with the name
 Coco (footballer) (born 1969), Spanish footballer
 Coco (cartoonist) (born 1982), French cartoonist
 Coco the Clown (Nicolai Poliakoff; 1900–1974), Russian-British clown

Arts and entertainment

Characters
 Coco Bandicoot, from the video game series Crash Bandicoot
Coco Hernandez, from the TV series Fame
 Coco Pommel, from the American/Canadian cartoon series My Little Pony: Friendship Is Magic
 Coco Wexler, from Zoey 101
 Coco, from the American cartoon series Foster's Home for Imaginary Friends
 CoCo, in the anime series Boku no Pico
 Coco, from the manga series Toriko
 Coco, in Tintin in the Congo
 Coco, great-grandmother of protagonist Miguel in the Pixar animated movie Coco (2017 film)

Films
 Coco (2009 film), a French comedy film written, directed, and starring Gad Elmaleh
 Coco (2017 film), an American computer-animated fantasy film produced by Pixar Animation Studios
 Pokémon the Movie: Secrets of the Jungle, a 2020 Japanese anime film based on Satoshi Tajiri's Pokémon media franchise
 Kolamaavu Kokila (2018 film) (abbrev. COCO), a 2018 Indian Tamil-language black comedy crime film, directed by Nelson Dilipkumar and starring Nayanthara

Music
 Coco (music), a style of African-influenced music from northern Brazil
 Coco (musical), a 1969 Broadway show based on the life of Coco Chanel
 Coco Records, a Latin label in the mid-1970s, of Eddie Palmieri and others
 CoCo (band), a J-pop band
 Coco (album), by American singer Colbie Caillat, 2007
 Coco, an album by Parov Stelar, 2009
 Coco (soundtrack), the soundtrack album to the Disney/Pixar 2017 film of the same name
 "Coco" (Wejdene song), song by French singer Wejdene, 2020
 "Coco" (24kGoldn song), by Americans rappers 24kGoldn and DaBaby, 2020 
 "Co-Co" (Sweet song), single by the Sweet, 1971
 "CoCo" (O.T. Genasis song), 2014
 "CoCo Freestyle", a 2015 song by Lil Wayne; see Lil Wayne videography
 "Coco" (PewDiePie song), diss track by PewDiePie, 2021

Places
 Coco, a comunidad at the Lapa barrio in Salinas municipality, Puerto Rico
 Coco, West Virginia, an unincorporated community
 Cocos Island (Isla del Coco), Costa Rican island and National Park
 Coco Islands, two Burmese islands in the Indian Ocean
 Coco Island (île aux Cocos), southernmost island of the Cargados Carajos Shoals
 Cocó Park, an urban park in Fortaleza, Brazil
 Coco River (disambiguation)
 El Coco, Coclé, a township in Panama
 El Coco, Panamá Oeste, a township in Panama
 6436 Coco, an asteroid

Science and technology
 COCO (dataset), Common Objects in Context, a dataset for object detection training and evaluation
 Coco (robot), a robot at the Massachusetts Institute of Technology
 Co-Co locomotives, code for a locomotive wheel arrangement
 CoCo Research Centre, Centre for Research on Computer-supported Learning and Cognition, University of Sydney
 Coco/R, a compiler generator
 6436 Coco, an asteroid
 Archambault Coco, a French Classe Mini sailboat design for racing in the Mini Transat 6.50
 Tandy/TRS-80 Color Computer, Tandy Color Computer, nicknamed CoCo
 Zanthoxylum coco, the coco tree of South America

Other 
 Coco (gorilla) (1971–2018), western lowland gorilla born in San Francisco Zoo
 Coco (perfume), a women's perfume by Chanel
 Coco (sailboat), a 1985 French racer
 CoCo (toys), a construction toy
 CoCo Fresh Tea & Juice, a bubble tea drink franchise based in Taiwan
 Contingent convertible bond, in finance
 CoCo Ichibanya, a Japanese curry restaurant chain
 USS Coco (SP-110), a U.S. Navy patrol boat

See also
 Coco's, an American restaurant chain
 Co-Co (disambiguation)
 Coco Chanel (disambiguation)
 Coco3 (disambiguation)
 
 Cocoa (disambiguation)
 Koko (disambiguation)
 Coca (disambiguation)